Elcy Goulart de Freitas (born 5 December 1938), known as just Elcy, is a Brazilian footballer. He played in one match for the Brazil national football team in 1959. He was also part of Brazil's squad for the 1959 South American Championship that took place in Ecuador.

References

External links
 
 

1938 births
Living people
Brazilian footballers
Brazil international footballers
Sportspeople from Recife
Association football forwards
Sport Club do Recife players
Sociedade Esportiva Palmeiras players
Clube Náutico Capibaribe players